Jorunn Horgen (born 6 December 1966) is a Norwegian windsurfer. She was born in Hokksund. She participated at the 1992 Summer Olympics, where she placed 8th, and at the 1996 Summer Olympics, where she placed fifth. She is the world champion from 1984, 1986, 1987, 1989, 1991, 1992 and 1995.

References

External links
 
 
 

1966 births
Living people
Norwegian windsurfers
Female windsurfers
Norwegian female sailors (sport)
Olympic sailors of Norway
Sailors at the 1992 Summer Olympics – Lechner A-390
Sailors at the 1996 Summer Olympics – Mistral One Design
People from Øvre Eiker
Sportspeople from Viken (county)